Curuzú Cuatiá Department is a  department of Corrientes Province in Argentina.

Settlements and villages
 Cazadores Correntinos
 Curuzú Cuatiá
 Perugorría

External links
 

Departments of Corrientes Province